Elisabeth Jaquette is an American translator of contemporary Arabic literature. Her work has been shortlisted for the National Book Award and TA First Translation Prize, and supported by the Jan Michalski Foundation, the PEN/Heim Translation Fund, and several English PEN Translates Awards. She has a BA from Swarthmore College, a MA from Columbia University, and was a CASA Fellow at The American University in Cairo. She is also Executive Director of the American Literary Translators Association.

Selected works

Translator
 Minor Detail by Adania Shibli (New Directions, 2020)
 The Frightened Ones by Dima Wannous (Knopf, 2020) (nominated for the Banipal Prize for Arabic Literary Translation in 2021)
 Thirteen Months of Sunrise by Rania Mamoun (Comma Press, 2019)
The Apartment in Bab el-Louk by Donia Maher (Darf Publishers, 2017)
Suslov's Daughter by Habib Abdulrab Sarori (Darf Publishers, 2017)
The Queue by Basma Abdel Aziz (Melville House, 2016)

See also
 List of Arabic-English translators

References

American translators
Living people
Swarthmore College alumni
Columbia University alumni
Year of birth missing (living people)